Diederik Rudolf Simon (born 10 April 1970 in Bloemendaal, North Holland) is a rower from the Netherlands, who competed for his native country in five consecutive Summer Olympics.

He won the gold medal with the Holland Acht (Holland Eight) at the 1996 Summer Olympics in Atlanta, Georgia, United States. He earned silver medals in the Men's Quadruple Sculls (Sydney 2000) and in the Men's Eights (Athens 2004). After becoming a coach, he rejoined the national team in 2007, placing fourth at the Beijing Olympics (2008) and fifth at the London Olympics (2012), both in the Dutch Men's Eights. He trained for his sixth Olympics in Rio de Janeiro 2016, but was not selected for the Dutch team.

Simon auctioned off his Olympic gold medal to raise money for Nereus Rowing Club in Amsterdam. He left his second silver medal in an Athens taxi but it was returned to him after he reported the loss to the police.

References

External links
  Dutch Olympic Committee

1970 births
Living people
People from Bloemendaal
Dutch male rowers
Rowers at the 1996 Summer Olympics
Rowers at the 2000 Summer Olympics
Rowers at the 2004 Summer Olympics
Rowers at the 2008 Summer Olympics
Rowers at the 2012 Summer Olympics
Olympic rowers of the Netherlands
Olympic gold medalists for the Netherlands
Olympic silver medalists for the Netherlands
Olympic medalists in rowing
Medalists at the 2004 Summer Olympics
Medalists at the 2000 Summer Olympics
Medalists at the 1996 Summer Olympics
Sportspeople from North Holland